Zdislava Berka (also Zdislava of Lemberk;  1220–1252, in what is now the northern part of Czech Republic) was the wife of Havel of Markvartice, Duke of Lemberk, and is a Czech saint of the Roman Catholic Church. She was a "wife, mother, and one of the earliest lay Dominicans". She was a "precociously pious child", running away at the age of seven to the forest to become a hermit. She was forced by her family to return home, and when she was 15, they forced her to marry wealthy nobleman Havel of Markvartice. He treated her brutally, but she was eventually able to perform acts of charity, give refuge to the poor and dispossessed at their home, found and support two priories, and join the Third Order of Saint Dominic as a layperson. She died in 1252. She is the patron saint of Bohemia, of difficult marriages, and of those who are ridiculed for their piety. Her feast day is on 1 January.

Life
Zdislava was from the town of Litoměřice in what is now the northern part of the Czech Republic, to a Bohemian noble family. Her devout mother was born in Sicily and came to Bohemia as "a member of the retinue" of Queen Kunigunde. During her childhood, Zdislava went with her mother to visit Kunigunde, who probably first exposed Zdislava to the Dominicans. She might have met Ceslaus and Hyacinth of Poland. Zdislava, a "precociously pious child", was "extremely pious from her infancy", giving money away to charity at a young age. When she was seven years old, she ran away from her home into the forest to pursue a life of prayer, penance, and a solitary life as a hermit. Her family found her, though, and forced her to return home. When she was 15, her family forced her to marry, despite her objections, the wealthy nobleman Havel of Markvartice, who owned Lemberk Castle, a fortified castle in a frontier area that was occasionally attacked by Mongol invaders. Zdislava and Havel had four children.

Zdislava's husband was "a man of violent temper" and treated her brutally, but "by her patience and gentleness she secured in the end considerable freedom of action in her practices of devotion, her austerities and her many works of charity". She devoted herself to the poor, opening the castle doors to those dispossessed by the invasions. Hagiographer Robert Ellsberg stated that Havel tolerated her "extravagant charity" because she followed his wishes and wore the costly clothes fitting her rank and station and would indulge in his "extravagant feasts" with him. Zdislava had ecstasies and visions, received the Eucharist daily even though it was not a common practice at the time, and performed miracles; one account reports that she even raised the dead.

Ellsberg reported that Zdislava donated to hospitals and built churches with her own hands. According to one story, she gave their bed to a sick, fever-stricken refugee; Havel "became indignant at her hospitality" and was prepared to eject the man, but found a figure of the crucified Christ there instead. Writer Joan Carroll Cruz called the incident a "miracle", but one account states that she replaced the bed with a crucifix. The incident "deeply impressed" Havel, though, and he relaxed the restrictions he had placed on her. Eventually, he allowed her to build St. Lawrence Priory (a Dominican convent for women), donate money to another convent for men in Gabel, a nearby town, and join the Third Order of Saint Dominic as a layperson. Hagiographer Alban Bulter states, however, that "the alleged connection of [Zdislava] with the third order of St Dominic remains somewhat of a problem, for the first formal rule for Dominican tertiaries of which we have knowledge belongs to a later date".

Shortly after founding St. Lawrence Priory, Zdislava fell terminally ill; she consoled her husband and children by telling them that "she hoped to help them more from the next world than she had ever been able to do in this". She died on 1 January 1252, and was buried, at her request, at St. Lawrence.

Veneration

Shortly after her death, Zdislava is reported to have appeared to her grieving husband, dressed in a red robe, and comforted him by giving him a piece of the robe. Her appearance to him "greatly strengthened him in his conversion from a life of worldliness". According to hagiographer Agnes Dunbar, her room was still being shown to visitors to the Lemberk Castle into the 19th century. Zdislava was beatified by Pope Pius X in 1907 and canonized by Pope John Paul II in the Czech Republic in 1995. She is the patron saint of Bohemia, of difficult marriages, and of those who are ridiculed for their piety. Her feast day is 1 January.

References

 Cruz, Joan Carroll (2015). Lay Saints: Models of Family Life. Charlotte, North Carolina: Tan Books & Publishers. . OCLC 946007991.
 Farmer, David Hugh (2011). The Oxford Dictionary of Saints (5th ed.). Oxford: Oxford University Press. pp. 464–465. . OCLC 726871260.

1220s births
1252 deaths
People from Žďár nad Sázavou District
People from the Margraviate of Moravia
Czech Roman Catholic saints
13th-century Christian saints
Christian female saints of the Middle Ages
Canonizations by Pope John Paul II
Lay Dominicans
Dominican saints
Venerated Catholics by Pope John Paul II
Beatifications by Pope Pius X